Breton or Bretón is a surname. Notable people with the surname include:

Adela Breton (1849–1923), English archaeologist
André Breton (1896–1966), French author and surrealist theorist
André Breton (1934–1992), Canadian singer
Aurora Bretón (1950–2014), Mexican archer
Didier Breton, business executive
Pierre-Napoléon Breton (1858–1917), early Canadian numismatist
Joel Breton (born 1971), game producer, entrepreneur and disc jockey
Jules Adolphe Aime Louis Breton (1827–1906), French realist painter
Julio Carrasco Bretón (born 1950), Mexican artist
Malan Breton (born 1973), American fashion designer
Manuel Bretón de los Herreros (1796–1873), Spanish dramatist
Marisol Bretón (born 1975), Mexican archer
Micky Bretón (1960–2009), Dominican television writer, director, and producer
Nicholas Breton, 16th-century poet
Nora Bretón, Mexican physicist
Thierry Breton (born 1955), European Commissioner for the Internal Market
Tomás Bretón (1850–1923), Spanish musician and composer

fr:Breton (homonymie)
Ethnonymic surnames